Never Gonna Die is the twelfth studio album by the American punk rock band Pennywise, which was released on April 20, 2018.

Track listing

Personnel
Pennywise
 Jim Lindberg – vocals
 Fletcher Dragge – guitar
 Randy Bradbury – bass
 Byron McMackin – drums

Additional personnel
 Sergio Chavez – Engineer
 Michael Cortada – Illustration
 Jason Link – Layout, Design
 Eric Boulanger - Mastered By
 Cameron Webb - Producer, Engineer, Mixed By

Charts

References

2018 albums
Pennywise (band) albums
Epitaph Records albums